Aloeides carolynnae, Carolynn's copper, is a species of butterfly in the family Lycaenidae. It is endemic to South Africa.

The wingspan is 23–28 mm for males and 25–33 mm females. Adults are on wing from September to November and again from January to March in two generations per year.

The larvae probably feed on Aspalathus species.

Subspecies
Aloeides carolynnae carolynnae (fynbos in the West Cape, the Slanghoek Valley)
Aloeides carolynnae aurata Pringle, 1994 (fynbos or limestone ridges near De Hoop and sandy ground near Witsand)

References

Aloeides
Butterflies described in 1983
Endemic butterflies of South Africa
Taxonomy articles created by Polbot